John Shore (c. 1662 – 1752) was an English trumpeter and lutenist. He invented the tuning fork in 1711. Shore came from a family of musicians including the singer Catherine Shore. He was Sergeant Trumpeter to the court. He is credited with demonstrating that the trumpet which up till then had been a military instrument could be used in an orchestral role. Shore had parts specifically written for him by both George Frideric Handel and Henry Purcell.

References

English inventors
English trumpeters
Male trumpeters
1660s births
1752 deaths